Abbé Dominique G. F. de Rion de Prolhiac Dufour or de Fourt de Pradt (23 April 1759 in Allanches (Auvergne, France) – 18 March 1837 in Paris) was a French clergyman and ambassador.

In 1804 he became a secretary of Napoleon, in 1805 Bishop of Poitiers. On 12 May 1808 he was appointed as archbishop of Mechelen (resigned in 1815). In 1812 he was awarded the position of the French ambassador in Warsaw, preparing the Concordat of 1813. After the Napoleonic wars he published a series of books which portrayed Russia as a "despotic" and "Asiatic" power hungry to conquer Europe.

See also
 Archbishopric of Mechelen-Brussels

References

Sources

 Archbishop Dominique-Georges-Frédéric Dufour de Pradt

Bishops of Poitiers
19th-century French diplomats
19th-century Roman Catholic archbishops in Belgium
1759 births
1837 deaths
Roman Catholic archbishops of Mechelen-Brussels
Grand Chanceliers of the Légion d'honneur
Burials at Père Lachaise Cemetery
Belgian Roman Catholic archbishops